The 2018–19 Luge World Cup was a multi race tournament over a season for Luge, organised by the FIL. The season started on 24 November 2018 in Innsbruck, Austria, and finished 24 February 2019 in Sochi, Russia..

Calendar

Results

Men's singles

Women's singles

Doubles

Team relay

Standings

Men's singles 

Final standings after 12 events
(*Champion 2018)

Men's singles Sprint 

Final standings after 3 events
Only 8 lugers competed on all events

Women's singles 

Final standings after 12 events
(*Champion 2018)

Women's singles Sprint 

Final standings after 3 events
(*Champion 2018)
Only 8 lugers competed on all events

Doubles 

Final standings after 12 events
(*Champion 2018)

Doubles Sprint 

Final standings after 3 events
(*Champion 2018)
Only 8 double sleds competed on all events

Team Relay 

Final standings after 6 events
(*Champion 2018)

Medal table

References

External links
 FIL streaming service

2018-19
2018 in luge
2019 in luge